Teplinka is a rural locality (a selo) in Alexeyevsky District, Belgorod Oblast, Russia. The population was 213 as of 2010. There are 5 streets.

Geography 
Teplinka is located 18 km south of Alexeyevka (the district's administrative centre) by road. Shcherbakovo is the nearest rural locality.

References 

Rural localities in Alexeyevsky District, Belgorod Oblast
Biryuchensky Uyezd